Dobson is an English and Scottish surname.

Notable people with this surname include:

People

Acting
Anita Dobson (born 1949), English actress
The Dobson brothers, Michael, Paul, and Brian, English-Canadian voice actors
Kevin Dobson (1943–2020), American television actor
Peter Dobson (born 1964), American actor
Tamara Dobson (1947–2006), American actress

Art
Cowan Dobson born David Cowan (1894–1980), brother of Henry Raeburn, (1894–1980), Scottish portrait painter
Frank Dobson (1886–1963), British artist
Henry Raeburn Dobson (1901–1985), Scottish portrait and genre painter
Margaret Dobson, American artist
Mary Dobson, British artist
William Dobson (1610–1646), English painter

Military
Claude Congreve Dobson VC (1885–1940), British Royal Naval officer
David Dobson (born 1938), British vice admiral in the Royal Navy
Frederick William Dobson (1886–1935), British soldier

Music
Bonnie Dobson (born 1940), Canadian folk musician
Dobby Dobson (1942–2020), Jamaican reggae singer and record producer
Fefe Dobson (born 1985), Canadian singer and entertainer
Richard Dobson (1942–2017), American singer-songwriter
Simon Dobson (born 1981), English composer

Politics
Benjamin Alfred Dobson (1847–1898), English industrialist and mayor of Bolton
Frank Dobson (1940–2019), British politician
Henry Dobson (1841–1918), Australian politician
Jo-Anne Dobson (born 1966), Northern Irish politician
John Dobson (1824–1907) Canadian senator
Ruth Dobson (1918–1989), Australian diplomat

Science
Brian Dobson (1931–2012), English archaeologist
Chris Dobson (1949–2019), British chemist
David Clark Dobson (born 1962), American applied mathematician
Gordon Dobson (1889–1975), British meteorologist
John Dobson (amateur astronomer) (1915–2014), American popularizer of amateur astronomy

Sports
Aaron Dobson (born 1991), American football player
Austin Dobson (1912–1963), English racing driver
Chuck Dobson (1944–2021), American baseball player
Denys Dobson (1880–1916), England international rugby player
Dominic Dobson (born 1957), German racing driver
Frank Dobson (1885–1959), American college sports coach
Joe Dobson (1917–1994), American baseball player
Kenneth Dobson (1900–1960), English cricketer
Mark Dobson (born 1962), English cricketer
Matthew Dobson (born 1986), South African rugby player 
Noah Dobson (born 2000) Canadian ice hockey player
Pat Dobson (1942–2006), American baseball player
Tom Dobson (rugby union) (1871–1937), Scottish-born Wales international rugby player

Writing
Austin Dobson (1840–1921), English poet
Barrie Dobson (1931–2013), British historian
Bridget and Jerome Dobson, American writers of the Santa Barbara soap opera
Dennis Dobson (1919–1978), British book publisher
Ed Dobson (1949–2015), American author and pastor
Henry Austin Dobson (1840–1921), English poet and essayist
Joanne Dobson, (born 1942), American novelist
Rosemary Dobson (1920–2012), Australian poet

Other
Bryan Dobson (born 1960), Irish broadcaster
Caroline Matilda Dodson (1845–1898), American physician
Emily Dobson (1842–1934), Australian philanthropist
George Dobson (disambiguation)
Harmon Dobson (1913–1967), American entrepreneur and co-founder of Whataburger
James Dobson (born 1936), conservative Christian psychologist and radio host
John Dobson (1787–1865), English architect
Michael Dobson (disambiguation)
Paul Dobson (disambiguation)
Vernon Dobson (1923–2013), American Baptist minister

Fictional characters
Lawrence Dobson, a fictional character in the TV series Firefly
Zuleika Dobson, title character of a 1911 novel by Max Beerbohm

English-language surnames
Surnames of English origin
Patronymic surnames
Surnames from given names